The Mount Washington Observatory (MWObs) is a private, non-profit scientific and educational institution organized under the laws of the state of New Hampshire. The weather observation station is located on the summit of Mount Washington in New Hampshire. The Observatory's mission is to advance understanding of the natural systems that create the Earth's weather and climate, by maintaining its mountaintop weather station, conducting research and educational programs and interpreting the heritage of the Mount Washington region. The first regular meteorological observations on Mount Washington were conducted by the U.S. Signal Service, a precursor of the Weather Bureau, from 1870 to 1892. The Mount Washington station was the first of its kind in the world, setting an example followed in many other countries.

History

The U.S. Signal Service, a predecessor to the Weather Bureau, occupied the summit and kept records from 1870 to 1892. Starting in 1932, the current observatory began keeping records. On April 12, 1934, the observatory staff recorded a wind gust of 231 mph that at the time was the highest recorded wind speed in the world, a record that was held until 1996. The observatory's weather data have accumulated into a valuable climate record since. Temperature and humidity readings have been collected using a sling psychrometer, a simple device containing two mercury thermometers. Where most unstaffed weather stations have undergone technology upgrades, consistent use of the sling psychrometer has helped provide scientific precision to the Mount Washington climate record.

The observatory makes prominent use of the slogan "Home of the World's Worst Weather", a claim that originated with a 1940 article by Charles Brooks (the man generally given the majority of credit for creating the Mount Washington Observatory), titled  "The Worst Weather In the World" (even though the article concluded that Mt. Washington most likely did not have the world's worst weather). The Sherman Adams summit building, named for the 67th Governor of New Hampshire, houses the observatory; it is closed to the public during the winter and hikers are not allowed inside the building except for emergencies and pre-arranged guided tours.

Climatic data

Education

The Observatory holds a strong tradition of education. In addition to its meteorological and research endeavors, the Observatory is involved in many educational efforts which seek to inform individuals about the many significant aspects of weather, area history, and the mountain environment. MWObs educational facilities and programs include:
 Observatory Tours allow summit visitors to tour the Observatory's summit weather station and research facility. Tours are only offered to MWObs members.
 The Mount Washington Museum, begun in the 1940s, is located in the Sherman Adams Summit Building in Mount Washington, and illustrates the rich natural history and the fascinating human history of Mount Washington through exhibits, photographs, and video presentations.
 Distance Learning allows students grades 4-12 to video conference with observers at the summit and learn about climate and weather from those who experience and study it first hand.
 Winter EduTrips affords the general public the opportunity to overnight on the summit of Mount Washington mid-Winter without a technical mountaineering ascent. EduTrippers typically arrive and leave on a snowcat, though a hiking descent can be opted into on a nice day. EduTrips have themes such as "Implications of Global Climate Change," "White Mountain Geology," and "Photography on the Summit."
 Summer Day Trips
 Outreach Programs brings Observatory staffers to schools throughout the Northeastern US. Outreach events typically include experiments, demonstrations, and lessons which aim to help both students and teachers understand weather concepts. Made possible through a grant from Subaru of America.

Partners
The Mount Washington Observatory receives much of its support from contributing members. However, over the years the MWObs has also come to receive support from several company and organizational partners, including L.L. Bean, Eastern Mountain Sports (EMS), Cranmore Mountain Resort, the Mt. Washington Auto Road, and the Mt. Washington Valley Chamber of Commerce. In 2011, EMS replaced L.L. Bean as the official outfitter of the Observatory.

The United States Postal Service maintains a small post office for outgoing mail, located in the Sherman Adams building at the summit; the ZIP Code is 03589.

See also
Mount Washington State Park
Blue Hill Observatory

References

External links
Mount Washington Observatory
 The Meteorologial Records of the Mount Washington Observatory at Dartmouth College Library

Observatory
Meteorological observatories

fr:Mont Washington (New Hampshire)#Climat